Henry Cook Mumbrue (February 15, 1828April 8, 1898) was an American steamboat operator, businessman, and Wisconsin pioneer.  He served in the Wisconsin State Senate (1877–1878) and Assembly (1876), representing Waupaca County.  He was at one point the richest resident of Waupaca County, but his riverboat business was wiped out when train lines arrived in the region.  His name is often abbreviated as

Background 
Mumbrue was born in the village of Tyre, New York, on February 15, 1828; he was educated at the Falley Seminary in Fulton, New York. He became a cabinet and chair maker by trade. He came to Wisconsin with his family in 1849, and settled at Winneconne where in 1850 he opened a horse-powered chair factory. He engaged in steamboating for several years on Lake Winnebago and the Fox and Wolf rivers. Mumbrue came to Waupaca County in the 1850s, one of several Mumbrues who settled in the area, and took up farming. In late 1872 he bought an established drug store in the city. Mumbrue continued throughout his subsequent career to explore various forms of business: grist mills, lumber mills, livestock (buying and selling), as well as dry goods and general merchandise. is associated with various firm, including Mumbrue and Dayton; Mumbrue, Baldwin and Co.; Mumbrue and Rosche; Mumbrue and Oertel; and Mumbrue and Woodnorth (a dry goods store in the 1870s). In approximately 1873-1874 he had a house built in the then-popular Second Empire style, but sold in 1878. That two-story house, with a mansard roof, is still standing at 404 S. Main Street in Waupaca. and as of 1896 was in office at a salary of $1,600 per annum., but was replaced after the 1896 presidential election brought McKinley supporters into power by Adelbert Penney, who had bought Mumbrue's old house on Main Street in 1890.

References 

1828 births
1898 deaths
Farmers from Wisconsin
American merchants
Businesspeople from Wisconsin
County clerks in Wisconsin
Date of death unknown
Members of the Wisconsin State Assembly
People from Tyre, New York
People from Winneconne, Wisconsin
Wisconsin city council members
Wisconsin Reformers (19th century)
Wisconsin state senators
Wisconsin postmasters
People from Fulton, Oswego County, New York
19th-century American politicians
People from Winnebago County, Wisconsin